is a compilation album by Japanese singer/songwriter Mari Hamada, released on December 16, 1989 by Invitation. It is Hamada's first ballad-oriented album, featuring four new songs and three re-recordings of her past hits. The album was last reissued on October 22, 2008.

Hamada's 1994 international release All My Heart features "Over the Rainbow" and "Open Your Heart" rewritten in English as "With All My Heart" and "Out of My Hands", respectively.

Sincerely peaked at No. 2 on Oricon's albums chart. It was also certified Platinum by the RIAJ.

Track listing

Personnel 
 Michael Landau – guitar
 John Pierce – bass
 Randy Kerber – keyboards
 Tom Keane – keyboards
 John Keane – drums
 Donna Delory – backing vocals
 Mona Lisa Young – backing vocals
 Marc Russo – saxophone

Charts

Certification

References

External links 
  (Mari Hamada)
  (Victor Entertainment)
 
 

1989 compilation albums
Japanese-language compilation albums
Mari Hamada compilation albums
Victor Entertainment compilation albums